Västmanland County is one of the 29 multi-member constituencies of the Riksdag, the national legislature of Sweden. The constituency was established in 1970 when the Riksdag changed from a bicameral legislature to a unicameral legislature. It is conterminous with the county of Västmanland. The constituency currently elects eight of the 349 members of the Riksdag using the open party-list proportional representation electoral system. At the 2022 general election it had 208,376 registered electors.

Electoral system
Västmanland County currently elects eight of the 349 members of the Riksdag using the open party-list proportional representation electoral system. Constituency seats are allocated using the modified Sainte-Laguë method. Only parties that that reach the 4% national threshold and parties that receive at least 12% of the vote in the constituency compete for constituency seats. Supplementary leveling seats may also be allocated at the constituency level to parties that reach the 4% national threshold.

Election results

Summary

(Excludes leveling seats)

Detailed

2020s

2022
Results of the 2022 general election held on 11 September 2022:

The following candidates were elected:
 Constituency seats - Mikael Damsgaard (M), 1,908 votes; Åsa Eriksson (S), 1,641 votes; Caroline Högström (M), 621 votes; Lena Johansson (S), 1.119 votes; Angelica Lundberg (SD), 0 votes; Oscar Sjöstedt (SD), 105 votes; Olle Thorell (S), 1,105 votes; and Vasiliki Tsouplaki (V), 777 votes.

2010s

2018
Results of the 2018 general election held on 9 September 2018:

The following candidates were elected:
 Constituency seats - Åsa Coenraads (M), 336 votes; Åsa Eriksson (S), 929 votes; Ann-Christine From Utterstedt (SD), 163 votes; Pia Nilsson (S), 2,000 votes; Jessica Polfjärd (M), 2,475 votes; Oscar Sjöstedt (S), 78 votes; Olle Thorell (S), 1,297 votes; and Vasiliki Tsouplaki (V), 799 votes.
 Leveling seats - Roger Haddad (L), 1,205 votes.

2014
Results of the 2014 general election held on 14 September 2014:

The following candidates were elected:
 Constituency seats - Jonas Åkerlund (SD), 2 votes; Åsa Coenraads (M), 345 votes; Lars Eriksson (S), 1,028 votes; Stefan Jakobsson (SD), 2 votes; Pia Nilsson (S), 1,716 votes; Jessica Polfjärd (M), 2,266 votes; Olle Thorell (S), 1,537 votes; and Anna Wallén (S), 1,907 votes.
 Leveling seats - Roger Haddad (FP), 1,158 votes; and Stig Henriksson (V), 776 votes.

2010
Results of the 2010 general election held on 19 September 2010:

The following candidates were elected:
 Constituency seats - Staffan Anger (M), 1,015 votes; Åsa Coenraads (M), 441 votes; Roger Haddad (FP), 1,146 votes; Pia Nilsson (S), 1,584 votes; Sven-Erik Österberg (S), 4,154 votes; Jessica Polfjärd (M), 2,473 votes; Olle Thorell (S), 799 votes; and Anna Wallén (S), 1,351 votes.
 Leveling seats - Agneta Luttropp (MP), 267 votes; Kent Persson (V), 431 votes; and Margareta Sandstedt (SD), 67 votes.

2000s

2006
Results of the 2006 general election held on 17 September 2006:

The following candidates were elected:
 Constituency seats - Staffan Anger (M), 953 votes; Agneta Berliner (FP), 672 votes; Margareta Israelsson (S), 1,234 votes; Jörgen Johansson (C), 789 votes; Pia Nilsson (S), 1,252 votes; Sven-Erik Österberg (S), 2,878 votes; Jessica Polfjärd (M), 1,890 votes; and Olle Thorell (S), 580 votes.
 Leveling seats - Kent Persson (V), 454 votes.

2002
Results of the 2002 general election held on 15 September 2002:

The following candidates were elected:
 Constituency seats - Kerstin Heinemann (FP), 1,226 votes; Stig Henriksson (V), 858 votes; Tomas Högström (M), 1,404 votes; Margareta Israelsson (S), 1,567 votes; Torsten Lindström (KD), 619 votes; Göran Magnusson (S), 977 votes; Sven-Erik Österberg (S), 2,539 votes; Paavo Vallius (S), 601 votes; and Mariann Ytterberg (S), 1,301 votes.
 Leveling seats - Jörgen Johansson (C), 626 votes.

1990s

1998
Results of the 1998 general election held on 20 September 1998:

The following candidates were elected:
 Constituency seats - Karin Falkmer (M), 1,558 votes; Lena Hjelm-Wallén (S), 6,146 votes; Tomas Högström (M), 2,015 votes; Margareta Israelsson (S), 600 votes; Magnus Jacobsson (KD), 3 votes; Tanja Linderborg (V), 1,318 votes; Göran Magnusson (S), 662 votes; Sven-Erik Österberg (S), 814 votes; and Mariann Ytterberg (S), 582 votes.
 Leveling seats - Kerstin Heinemann (FP), 709 votes.

1994
Results of the 1994 general election held on 18 September 1994:

1991
Results of the 1991 general election held on 15 September 1991:

1980s

1988
Results of the 1988 general election held on 18 September 1988:

1985
Results of the 1985 general election held on 15 September 1985:

1982
Results of the 1982 general election held on 19 September 1982:

1970s

1979
Results of the 1979 general election held on 16 September 1979:

1976
Results of the 1976 general election held on 19 September 1976:

1973
Results of the 1973 general election held on 16 September 1973:

1970
Results of the 1970 general election held on 20 September 1970:

References

Riksdag constituencies
Riksdag constituencies established in 1970
Riksdag constituency